In applied mathematics, the complex Mexican hat wavelet is a low-oscillation, complex-valued, wavelet for the continuous wavelet transform. This wavelet is formulated in terms of its Fourier transform as the Hilbert analytic signal of the conventional Mexican hat wavelet:

Temporally, this wavelet can be expressed in terms of the error function,
as:

This wavelet was proposed in 2002 by Addison et al. for applications requiring high temporal precision time-frequency analysis.

References 

Continuous wavelets